Mary Szybist (born 20 September 1970) is an American poet.  She won the National Book Award for Poetry for her collection Incarnadine.

Life
She grew up in Pennsylvania, earned her B.A. and M.T. (Master of Teaching) from the University of Virginia, and attended the Iowa Writers' Workshop, where she was a Teaching-Writing Fellow.

Szybist's Incarnadine (Graywolf Press, 2013) was the recipient of the 2013 National Book Award for Poetry, and her collection Granted (Alice James Books, 2003) won the 2003 Beatrice Hawley Award from Alice James Books and the 2004 Great Lakes Colleges Association New Writers Award, and was a finalist for the 2004 National Book Critics Circle Award in Poetry. 
In a feature on NBCCA poetry finalists, the Christian Science Monitor wrote: 

Szybist's poetry has appeared in Denver Quarterly, Colorado Review, AGNI, Virginia Quarterly Review, The Iowa Review, Poetry, Tin House, and The Kenyon Review, and The Best American Poetry 2008.

Szybist is an associate professor of English at Lewis & Clark College in Portland, Oregon, and a faculty member at the Warren Wilson College MFA Program for Writers. 
She also has taught at Kenyon College, the University of Iowa, the Tennessee Governor’s School for Humanities, the University of Virginia’s Young Writers’ Workshop, and West High School in Iowa City.

Honors and awards
 2019 Laureate of The George W. Hunt, S.J., Prize for Journalism, Arts & Letters
2013 National Book Award for Poetry
 2009 National Endowment for the Arts Literature Fellowship
 2009 Witter Bynner Fellowship
 2004 Great Lakes Colleges Association New Writers Award
 2003 National Book Critics Circle Award Finalist
 2002 Beatrice Hawley Award
 1996 Rona Jaffe Foundation Writers' Award
 Academy of American Poets Prize

Bibliography

Poetry

Granted, Alice James Books, 2003,

List of poems

References

External links
 Mary Szybist: Official Website
 Web del Sol > Chapbook Feature > Mary Szybist, Poems from Granted
 PBS: The NewsHour > ArtBeat: Weekly Poem: Apology, by Mary Szybist
 Kenyon College > The Kenyon Collegian > Interview with Mary Szybist
 Poetry Foundation > In Tennessee I Found a Firefly, by Mary Szybist

Kenyon College faculty
Curry School of Education alumni
Lewis & Clark College faculty
Poets from Pennsylvania
Poets from Oregon
Iowa Writers' Workshop alumni
National Endowment for the Arts Fellows
Warren Wilson College faculty
Living people
Place of birth missing (living people)
American women poets
Rona Jaffe Foundation Writers' Award winners
1970 births
21st-century American poets
American women academics
21st-century American women writers